The Baluhya Political Union was a political party in Kenya.

History
The party was established in July 1960. It nominated a single candidate, Musa Amalemba in North Nyanza, for the 1961 general elections. The party received 3.3% of the national vote and Amalemba was elected. In the 1963 elections its vote share was reduced to 0.8%, resulting in it losing its seat.

As the process of Kenya becoming a one-party state began, the party was deregistered in March 1965.

References

Defunct political parties in Kenya
1960 establishments in Kenya
Political parties established in 1960
1965 disestablishments in Kenya
Political parties disestablished in 1965